Imkaan is a UK-based Black feminist organation dedicated to addressing violence against Black and minoritised women and girls.

Imkaan was founded in 2004. From 2004 to 2013 its executive director was Marai Larasi. Since May 2019 Imkaan's executive director has been Baljit Banga.

In March 2020 Imkaan launched a report, Reclaiming Voice, on sexual violence against minoritized women.

References

External links
 Imkaan website

Organizations established in 2004
2004 establishments in England
Black feminist organizations
Women's organisations based in England